Prus is a surname. Notable people with the surname include:

Albert Prus (born 1987), Russian footballer
Bolesław Prus (1847–1912), Polish writer
Edward Prus (1931–2007), Polish politologist
Elena Prus (born 1986), Ukrainian badminton player
Gunter Prus (13th century), Polish bishop
Łucja Prus (1942–2002), Polish singer
Mateusz Prus (born 1990), Polish footballer
Michael Prus (born 1968), German football coach and former player

See also
Prus II Wilczekosy coat of arms
Prus III coat of arms